Snoticles is an iOS physics puzzle video game published by Adult Swim and released on December 15, 2011.

Gameplay
Players control creatures called Snoticles and must get rid of the enemy Blots.

Critical reception
The game has a Metacritic rating of 88% based on 5 critic reviews.

AppSafari said "Snoticles is a very fun iOS game from Adult Swim and you will get hours of fun out of this app. Between the different characters and the difficult puzzles, difficult in the later stages at least, you will be challenged to a fun degree that does not become too annoying. " AppSpy wrote "With the premise of creatures made out of snot, this is obviously meant for a younger male audience, but what we have here is a good game that is worth a play from everyone. " Modojo said "The characters are gross. The actual game play, on the other hand, is golden. You only receive so much ammunition per character, and once it runs out, you must restart that stage from the beginning. What ensues is slow paced fun, as you strategize the best ways to annihilate the Blots. " 148Apps said "The puzzles are fun and the game is very well designed. If players can play without losing their lunch, they are likely to have a great time. " Snoticles said "Snoticles is a good game. It's a fun physics puzzler that provides a mid-tier challenge. But there are so many similar games out there, and this one doesn't do much at all to set itself apart. "

References

2011 video games
IOS games
IOS-only games
Adult Swim games
Puzzle video games
Video games developed in the United States